Pittsfield Municipal Airport  is two miles west of Pittsfield, in Berkshire County, Massachusetts. The National Plan of Integrated Airport Systems for 2011–2015 categorized it as a general aviation facility.

The first airline flights were Mohawk DC-3s, 1953 to 1958; Northeast DC-3s stopped at Pittsfield 1953-54 to 1962. Flights on commuter airlines like Command Airways and Precision Airlines lasted until 1983-84; Precision flew to Rutland, Vermont and New York City LaGuardia Airport.

Facilities
The airport covers 550 acres (223 ha) at an elevation of 1,194 feet (364 m). It has two asphalt runways: 8/26 is 5,790 by 100 feet (1,765 x 30 m) and 14/32 is 3,496 by 100 feet (1,066 x 30 m).

In the year ending August 22, 2012 the airport had 33,000 aircraft operations, average 90 per day: 88% general aviation, 11% air taxi, and 1% military. 37 aircraft were then based at the airport: 76% single-engine, 13% multi-engine, and 11% jet.

References 

https://www.cityofpittsfield.org/departments/airport/airport_safety_improvements_and_expansion.php

External links 
 Airport page at City of Pittsfield website
 Lyon Aviation, the fixed-base operator (FBO)
 Aerial image as of April 1995 from USGS The National Map
 

Pittsfield, Massachusetts
Airports in Berkshire County, Massachusetts